Ga–Dangme is a branch of the Kwa language family. Ga–Dangme is made up of just two languages: Ga and Dangme. They are closely related and have sometimes been considered as a single language. There are many similarities in the basic vocabulary. There are also many words that are different, and grammatical differences, particularly in the verb phrase. Where they differ, Adangme is usually closer to the original Proto-Ga–Dangme than Ga.

Footnotes

References

 
Kwa languages